Ángeles Montolio was the defending champion, but lost in quarterfinals to Anca Barna.

Magüi Serna won the title by defeating Barna 6–4, 6–2 in the final.

Seeds

Draw

Finals

Top half

Bottom half

References
 Main and Qualifying Draws (WTA)
 ITF Tournament profile

2002 Women's Singles
2002 WTA Tour
Estoril Open